Bandar Baru UDA is a suburb in Johor Bahru, Johor, Malaysia. It mainly consists of four phases where this townships has developed well and strategically located in the middle of Johor Bahru Town and transportation. The main population of this town is Malay.

Most of those staying at the terrace houses are professionals and higher middle class Malays. However, there are small portion of rich people living in the bungalows areas, as well lower middle class population staying in the flats.

Education
It has two primary schools (Sekolah Kebangsaan Bandar Uda (2) and Sekolah Kebangsaan Kompleks Uda) as well as a secondary school, Sekolah Menengah Kebangsaan Bandar Baru UDA.

Transportation
The suburb is accessible by Causeway Link (1B, 5B, 51B) from Johor Bahru Sentral railway station.

See also
 Bandar Baru UDA Jamek Mosque

References

Johor Bahru housing estates
Townships in Johor